St. Anthony's fire (also known historically as Ignis Sacer and Holy Fire) may refer to:

Ergotism, the effect of long-term ergot poisoning, traditionally due to the ingestion of alkaloids
Erysipelas, an acute infection, typically with a skin rash
St Anthony's Fire (novel), a 1994 Doctor Who novel  by Mark Gatiss
Shingles, a painful viral disease, also called herpes zoster

See also
Saint Anthony (disambiguation)
St. Elmo's fire, a weather phenomenon